Bochasan Junction railway station is a railway station on the Western Railway network in the state of Gujarat, India. Passenger trains halt at Bochasan Junction railway station.

Major trains

Following trains halt at Bochasan Junction railway station in both direction:

 59101/02 Kathana–Vadodara Passenger
 59103/04 Kathana–Vadodara Passenger

See also
 Anand district

References

Railway stations in Anand district
Vadodara railway division
Railway junction stations in Gujarat